Tengiz Sichinava (15 May 1972 – 4 March 2021) was a Georgian football player and manager, who played as a midfielder.

Sichinava left Georgia in 2001 for Russian First Division side Baltika Kaliningrad. In 2005, he left Georgia again for Azerbaijan side Turan Tovuz, then MKT Araz.

Sichinava made his Georgia national team debut on 4 September 1999.

References

1972 births
2021 deaths
People from Sukhumi
Footballers from Georgia (country)
Georgia (country) international footballers
Association football midfielders
FC Dinamo Sukhumi players
FC Dinamo Batumi players
FC Baltika Kaliningrad players
FC Kristall Smolensk players
FC Sioni Bolnisi players
FC Lokomotivi Tbilisi players
Turan-Tovuz IK players
FK MKT Araz players
Expatriate footballers from Georgia (country)
Expatriate footballers in Russia
Expatriate footballers in Azerbaijan
Expatriate sportspeople from Georgia (country) in Russia
Expatriate sportspeople from Georgia (country) in Azerbaijan
Place of death missing